Eupleura caudata is a species of sea snail, a marine gastropod mollusk in the family Muricidae, the murex snails or rock snails. This species occurs on the Atlantic Coast of North America.

References

Muricidae
Molluscs of the Atlantic Ocean
Gastropods described in 1822
Taxa named by Thomas Say